The Durand Stone is an artifact in Bahrain dating back to the Kassite period (1600 BC — 1155  BC). Named after Captain Edward Law Durand who had first identified it, the stone is a 25–30 cm wide and 70–80 cm long black basalt sculpture possibly in the shape of a prow of a boat or an animal's tongue, with a cuneiform inscription.

Contents
The inscription, in Old Babylonian cuneiform script, was translated by Henry Rawlinson to read: "The palace of Rimum, servant of (the god) Inzak, (and) man of (the tribe of) Agarum".
Inzak, son of Enki, was a principal god of Bahrain, and the Durand Stone provides archaeological evidence for identifying these islands as 'the abode of the blessed' of Dilmun referred to by Sumerian literature.

History
Originally housed in the "holy of holies" of the Madrasseh-i Daood mosque (now destroyed) in Bilad Al Qadeem, it was spotted in 1878 by Captain Edward Law Durand (first-assistant resident to the Persian Gulf Residency), who tricked the mullahs into releasing it to him by telling them it was a fire-worshipper's stone and therefore unIslamic. The stone itself, a diorite, is believed to originate from Oman or southeastern Iran.

The contents of the inscription helped archaeologists conclude that Bahrain was the location of the Dilmun civilization.

Today

According to the records of Charles Belgrave, the Durand Stone was destroyed during the Second World War. A replica of the Durand Stone lies in the Bahrain National Museum.

References

Sculptures in Bahrain
Sculpture of the Ancient Near East
Stone sculptures
Dilmun